Kim Min-sun (born 16 June 1999) is a South Korean speed skater. She won gold in the women's 500 metres event at the 2016 Winter Youth Olympics in Lillehammer and competed in the women's 500 metres at the 2018 Winter Olympics.

Personal records

References

External links
 

 

1999 births
Living people
South Korean female speed skaters
Olympic speed skaters of South Korea
Speed skaters at the 2018 Winter Olympics
Speed skaters at the 2022 Winter Olympics
Place of birth missing (living people)
Speed skaters at the 2017 Asian Winter Games
Speed skaters at the 2016 Winter Youth Olympics
Youth Olympic gold medalists for South Korea
Competitors at the 2023 Winter World University Games
Medalists at the 2023 Winter World University Games
21st-century South Korean women
Universiade medalists in speed skating
Universiade gold medalists for South Korea